Captured Live at the Forum is the third album by American rock band Three Dog Night, released in 1969 (see 1969 in music).

The album was recorded at The Forum in Los Angeles.  According to Three Dog Nightmare, Three Dog Night opened this show in support of Steppenwolf, who were recording various shows on their 1969–70 tour for an upcoming live album (Steppenwolf Live, released 1970).  Steppenwolf and Three Dog Night both recorded for the ABC/Dunhill label and shared the same production team, and it was decided to record Three Dog Night on this occasion as well, despite the band's having only released two albums to date. The choice paid off, as Captured Live at the Forum reached #6 on the Billboard album chart.

All the songs featured on Captured Live at the Forum were previously issued in studio versions by Three Dog Night. "Feelin' Alright", "Eli's Coming", and "Easy to Be Hard" were included on the band's second studio album Suitable for Framing, and the remainder on their eponymous first album.

Original pressings of the album bore the headline "In front of an audience over 18,000 on September 12, 1969 in Los Angeles, Three Dog Night was Captured Live at the Forum."  Future pressings would remove September 12 date, however, and lead singer Chuck Negron's autobiography Three Dog Nightmare would subsequently list the concert's performance date as July 14, 1969.

Track listing 
 "Heaven Is in Your Mind" (Jim Capaldi, Steve Winwood, Chris Wood) – 3:23
 "Feelin' Alright" (Dave Mason) – 4:55
 "It's for You" (John Lennon, Paul McCartney) – 2:02
 "Nobody" (Beth Beatty, Dick Cooper, Ernie Shelby) – 3:03
 "One" (Harry Nilsson) – 3:37
 "Chest Fever" (J.R. Robertson) – 7:02
 "Eli's Coming" (Laura Nyro) – 3:45
 "Easy to Be Hard" (Galt MacDermot, James Rado, Gerome Ragni) – 4:25
 "Try a Little Tenderness" (Jimmy Campbell, Reginald Connelly, Harry M. Woods) – 6:08

Personnel

Three Dog Night
 Cory Wells – vocals
 Chuck Negron – vocals
 Danny Hutton – vocals
 Mike Allsup – guitar
 Joe Schermie – bass
 Floyd Sneed – drums
 Jimmy Greenspoon – keyboard

Production 
 Producer: Richard Podolor
 Engineer: Bill Cooper
 Photography: Ed Caraeff
 Roadie, Lighting: Dennis Albro
 Roadie, Sound: Lee Carlton

Charts 
Album – Billboard (United States)

Certifications

Notes 

1969 live albums
Three Dog Night albums
Albums produced by Richard Podolor
Dunhill Records live albums
RCA Victor live albums
Stateside Records live albums
MCA Records live albums
Albums recorded at the Forum